Major-General Walter Reynell Taylor CB (5 April 1928 – 22 January 1996) was a British Army officer who became commander of British Forces Cyprus.

Early life
Taylor was born on 5 April 1928 the son of Colonel Richard Reynell Taylor. He was educated at Wellington College before moving on to Sandhurst.

Military career
Taylor was commissioned into the 4th/7th Royal Dragoon Guards in December 1948, who were based at Sabratha in Libya. In 1957 he joined the Staff College at Camberley followed by a two-year exchange appointment in Canada. On return from Canada he returned to the staff college as an instructor. On promotion to lieutenant-colonel in 1967 he joined the Defence Planning Staff in Singapore. In 1967 he moved to Germany to command his regiment; two years later, now a full colonel, he returned to the Staff College.

Taylor was promoted to brigadier and became commander of 12th Armoured Brigade in September 1972 at Osnabruck. In 1975 he attended the Royal College of Defence Studies in London before becoming deputy director of military operations at the Ministry of Defence in January 1976 and commander of British Forces Cyprus and Administrator of the Sovereign Base Areas in May 1978. He went on to be Chief of Staff for British Army of the Rhine in December 1980 before retiring in January 1984.

Taylor was appointed a Companion of the Order of the Bath on 12 June 1981.

Later life
Taylor left the Army in 1984 and became director of the Middle East Training Centre in Nicosia, Cyprus before returning to Somerset, England, in 1987, where he bought a farm. Taylor then became involved as a consultant in the concrete industry and later spent time in the Middle East involved in a technology transfer programme for concrete batching plants as part of the Al-Yamamah arms deal.

Family life
Taylor married Doreen Dodge in 1954 and they had a son and a daughter; he remarried in 1982 to Rosemary Breed, with whom he had another son. Taylor died from heart failure on 22 January 1996; he was aged 67.

References

British Army generals
1928 births
1996 deaths
4th/7th Royal Dragoon Guards officers
Companions of the Order of the Bath
People educated at Wellington College, Berkshire
Graduates of the Royal Military Academy Sandhurst
Graduates of the Staff College, Camberley
Graduates of the Royal College of Defence Studies
Academics of the Staff College, Camberley